Richard Allan Smith (born June 29, 1948) is a Canadian former professional ice hockey player. He played from 1968 until 1981 in the National Hockey League (NHL) and the World Hockey Association (WHA). He won the Stanley Cup in 1970 with the Boston Bruins.

Playing career
Smith was originally drafted by the Boston Bruins in the second round (7th overall) in the 1966 NHL Amateur Draft. He played in Boston from 1968–69 to 1971–72. Boston traded him in 1972 to the California Golden Seals of the NHL. He played there until the end of the next season (1972–73) when he left the NHL for the World Hockey Association (WHA) and played for the Minnesota Fighting Saints. In 1975–76 Smith returned to the NHL to play for the St. Louis Blues. He would remain with the Blues until the 1976–77 NHL season when he returned to the Boston Bruins. In 1980 Rick Smith would leave Boston to play one more NHL season split between the Detroit Red Wings (11 games) and the Washington Capitals (40 games). He won the Stanley Cup with the Boston Bruins in 1970. Rick Smith was a steady defenseman, not a scorer but a reliable part of talented teams. An important part of winning Bruin teams who worked hard in every game he participated in.

Career statistics

Regular season and playoffs

External links
 
 Profile at hockeydraftcentral.com
 Picture of Rick Smith's name on the 1970 Stanley Cup plaque

1948 births
Living people
Boston Bruins draft picks
Boston Bruins players
California Golden Seals players
Canadian ice hockey defencemen
Detroit Red Wings players
Hamilton Red Wings (OHA) players
Ice hockey people from Ontario
Kansas City Blues players
Minnesota Fighting Saints players
Oklahoma City Blazers (1965–1977) players
Sportspeople from Kingston, Ontario
St. Louis Blues players
Stanley Cup champions
Washington Capitals players